Bugs 'n' Daffy (formerly That's Warner Bros.!) is an American animated anthology television series that premiered on The WB on September 11, 1995, as part of their Kids' WB weekday lineup. The series featured cartoons from the Warner Bros. Looney Tunes and Merrie Melodies library of classic animated shorts.

The series initially had 65 half-hour episodes, with three cartoons and a "Hip Clip" in each one. In 1997, a new batch of 65 episodes were created, in part due to Warners' acquisition of pre-1948 shorts due to Time Warner's merger with Turner Broadcasting System on October 10, 1996.

A companion series, The Daffy Duck Show, aired on Kids' WB's Saturday mornings lineup from 1996 to 1997. Bugs 'n' Daffy was removed from the weekday lineup in 1998.

Episodes

Season 1 (1995/1996)
 Cartoons marked with an asterisk (*) are black-and-white cartoons that have been computer-colorized.
 When That's Warner Bros.! became Bugs 'n' Daffy for the 1996–97 season, The Bee-Deviled Bruin was removed from episodes 24 and 54, presumably due to its violent content, and replaced with Beanstalk Bunny and What's Up, Doc?, respectively.

Season 2 (1997)
 Cartoons marked with an asterisk (*) are black-and-white cartoons that have been computer-colorized.

The Daffy Duck Show
 Cartoons marked with an asterisk (*) are black-and-white cartoons that have been computer-colorized.

References

Bugs 'n' Daffy